There are at least 118 named lakes and reservoirs in Glacier County, Montana.

Lakes
 Alkali Lake, el. 
 Allison Lake, el. 
 Atsina Lake, el. 
 Aubery Lake, el. 
 Bench Lake, el. 
 Big Spring Lake, el. 
 Boundary Lake, el. 
 Boy Lake, el. 
 Buffalo Lake, el. 
 Buffalo Lakes, el. 
 Bullhead Lake, el. 
 Cameron Lake, el. 
 Carcajou Lake, el. 
 Carlow Lake, el. 
 Cobalt Lake, el. 
 Conway Lake, el. 
 Cosley Lake, el. 
 Cracker Lake, el. 
 Croffs Lake, el. 
 Dog Gun Lake, el. 
 Duck Lake, el. 
 Elizabeth Lake, el. 
 Falling Leaf Lake, el. 
 Fishercap Lake, el. 
 Flatton Lake, el. 
 Four Horns Lake, el. 
 Glenns Lake, el. 
 Goat Haunt Lake, el. 
 Goat Lake, el. 
 Goose Lake, el. 
 Governor Pond, el. 
 Grassy Lake, el. 
 Green Lake, el. 
 Grinnell Lake, el. 
 Guardipee Lake, el. 
 Gunsight Lake, el. 
 Hay Lake, el. 
 Helen Lake, el. 
 Hidden Lake, el. 
 Hope Lake, el. 
 Horse Lake, el. 
 Iceberg Lake, el. 

 Ipasha Lake, el. 
 Josephine Lake, el. 
 Kaina Lake, el. 
 Katoya Lake, el. 
 Kennedy Lake, el. 
 Kipp Lake, el. 
 Kootenai Lakes, el. 
 Lake Frances, el. 
 Lake Janet, el. 
 Lake Josephine (Montana), el. 
 Lake Nooney, el. 
 Lake Wurdeman, el. 
 Lena Lake, el. 
 Little Buffalo Lake, el. 
 Lonely Lakes, el. 
 Lost Lake, el. 
 Lower Saint Mary Lake, el. 
 Lower Two Medicine Lake, el. 
 Lubec Lake, el. 
 Lukins Lake, el. 
 Magee Lake, el. 
 Margaret Lake, el. 
 Medicine Grizzly Lake, el. 
 Medicine Owl Lake, el. 
 Miche Wabun Lake, el. 
 Minnie White Horse Lake, el. 
 Mirror Pond, el. 
 Mokowanis Lake, el. 
 Morning Eagle Lake, el. 
 Morning Star Lake, el. 
 Nahsukin Lake, el. 
 Natahki Lake, el. 
 No Name Lake, el. 
 North Lakes, el. 
 Oldman Lake, el. 
 Otatso Lake, el. 
 Otokomi Lake, el. 
 Pike Lake, el. 
 Pitamakan Lake, el. 
 Poia Lake, el. 
 Pray Lake, el. 
 Ptarmigan Lake, el. 
 Red Eagle Lake, el. 
 Redhorn Lake, el. 
 Redrock Lake, el. 
 Running Crane Lake, el. 
 Saint Mary Lake, el. 
 Lake of the Seven Winds (aka Seven Winds of the Lake),, el. 
 Shaheeya Lake, el. 
 Sharp Lake, el. 
 Sky Lake, el. 
 Slide Lake, el. 
 Snow Moon Lake, el. 
 Spider Lake, el. 
 Stoney Indian Lake, el. 
 Stump Lake, el. 
 Sue Lake, el. 
 Swiftcurrent Lake, el. 
 Swiftcurrent Ridge Lake, el. 
 Three Bears Lake, el. 
 Toad Lake, el. 
 Twin Lakes, el. 
 Twin Lakes, el. 
 Two Medicine Lake, el. 
 Upper Grinnell Lake, el. 
 Upper Mission Lake, el. 
 Upper Two Medicine Lake, el. 
 Upper Waterton Lake, el. 
 Wahseeja Lake, el. 
 Whitecrow Lake, el. 
 Windmaker Lake, el. 
 Young Man Lake, el.

Reservoirs
 Four Horns Lake, el. 
 Kipps Lake, el. 
 Lake Sherburne, el. 
 Lower Two Medicine Reservoir, el. 
 Mission Lake, el.

See also
 List of lakes in Montana

Notes

Glacier